Stage Dive is a British online secondary ticket broker trading in the UK market and supplying tickets for concert, theatre and sports events.

Service
Founded in 2007, Stage Dive Online Limited is one of several secondary ticket brokers who launched in the wake of Ticketmaster’s loosening dominance of the secondary ticket industry, including Viagogo and Seatwave, and operates mostly through its  website, from which tickets can be found, selected and bought.

Favoured Venues
Stage Dive supplies tickets to venues across the UK but favours arena venues such as:

 The O2 arena, London
 Wembley Stadium, London
 Wembley Arena, London
 Royal Albert Hall, London
 Hammersmith Apollo, London
 Brixton Academy, London
 Hyde Park, London
 Manchester Evening News Arena, Manchester
 National Indoor Arena, Birmingham
 Birmingham NEC, Birmingham
 SECC, Glasgow

References

External links
 Stage Dive official website

Ticket sales companies